Cymolomia is a genus of moths belonging to the subfamily Olethreutinae of the family Tortricidae.

Species
Cymolomia hartigiana (Ratzeburg, 1840)
Cymolomia jinboi Kawabe, 1976
Cymolomia phaeopelta (Meyrick, 1921)
Cymolomia taigana Falkovitsh, 1966
Cymolomia vinolenta Diakonoff, 1973

See also
List of Tortricidae genera

References

External links
tortricidae.com

Tortricidae genera
Olethreutinae
Taxa named by Julius Lederer